Ethel Brez (August 12, 1937 – August 25, 2021) was an American television soap opera writer.

Positions held
Another World (hired by Harding Lemay)
 Script Writer (1974)

Days of Our Lives
 Associate Head Writer (1993–1994)

One Life to Live
 Associate Head Writer (1985–1992)

Passions (hired by James E. Reilly)
 Associate Head Writer (1999–2002)

Search for Tomorrow
Script Writer (1982–1984)

Awards and nominations
Daytime Emmy Award
Nomination, 2002, Best Writing, Passions
Nomination, 2001, Best Writing, Passions
Nomination, 1994, Best Writing, Days of our Lives
Nomination, 1992, Best Writing, One Life to Live
Nomination, 1990, Best Writing, One Life to Live
Win, 1987, Best Writing, One Life to Live

Writers Guild of America Award
Nomination, 2000, Best Writing, Passions
Nomination, 1993, Best Writing, Days of our Lives
Nomination, 1986, Best Writing, One Life to Live
Win, 1985, Best Writing, One Life to Live

References

External links

1937 births
2021 deaths
American soap opera writers
Writers Guild of America Award winners